Verneri Pohjola (born 23 December 1977  in Helsinki, Finland) is a Finnish jazz trumpeter.

Biography 
The son of bassist Pekka Pohjola, Pohjola studied at the Jazz and Pop Conservatory in Helsinki and the Örebro Music School. From 1999 he studied jazz music at the Sibelius-Akademie, where he met pianist Tuomo Prättälä, bassist Antti Lötjönen, and drummer Olavi Louhivuori, members of his Ilmiliekki Quartet in 2002. In 2003 they released their debut album March of the Alpha Males, followed by Take It With Me in 2006 .

In addition, Pohjola is a member of the band Quintessence, the band of Iro Haarla, the ensemble Suhkan Uhka of Antti Hytti and Jone Takamäki, the UMO Jazz Orchestra, and the post-rock band Silvio, where he plays the drums. With his brother Ilmari, he played with his father Pekka Pohjola for the first time on his album Views (2001) . His first solo album Aurora was first released 2009 by the Finnish independent label Texicalli Records and came out for the German label ACT Music 2011. The only non-original composition of the eight tracks is Joaquin Rodrigo's "Concierto de Aranjuez Amour".

The artist has been cited that his music is “about embracing life in all of its complex emotions, while we still have it. After all, the dead don’t dream.” The final phrase makes also the title of his 2020 solo album. The sidemen for this seven tracks comprising CD and vinyl disc release at Edition Records have been: Antti Lötjönen bass, Mika Kallio drums, Miikka Paatelainen pedal steel guitar, Tuomo Prättälä piano and electronics and Pauli Lyytinen soprano and tenor saxophone. The JazzTimes reviewer commented about Pohjola: "he plays ideas you haven’t heard before".

Honors 
His quartet was awarded the Teosto-Preis of the Association of Finnish Composers, and Pohjola was voted Artist of the Year at the Pori Jazz festival In 2004, the quartet was invited to the official reception by the Finnish president Tarja Halonen on the occasion of the Finnish Independence Day. In 2009 for his album Aurora, Pohjola received a Finnish jazz Emma Award as the ″Jazz Album of the Year".

Discography

Solo albums 
 2009: Aurora (ACT), with Juhani Aaltonen, Pepa Päivinen, Ilmari Pohjola, Aki Rissanen, Antti Lötjönen, Pekka Pohjola, Joonas Riippa, Meta4 String Quartet
 2011: Ancient History (ACT)
 2011: Music For The Play Mr Vertigo (KHY Suomen Musiikki Oy), with Joonas Riippa and Aki Rissanen
 2013: Rubidium (TUM Records), with Black Motor
 2014: Bullhorn (Edition EDN1056)
 2017: Pekka (Edition)
 2018: Animal Image (Edition), with Mika Kallio
 2020: The Dead Don't Dream (Edition)

Collaborations 
 With Quintessence
 2002: Talk Less Listen More (Texicalli Records)
 2005: 5 am (Jupiter)

 With Suhkan Uhka
 2003: Suhka (TUM Records)

 With Ilmiliekki Quartet
 2003: March Of The Alpha Males (TUM Records)
 2006: Take It With Me (TUM Records)
 2009: Vi Sålde Våra Hemman (KHY Suomen Musiikki Oy), with Emma Salokoski
 2019: Land Of Real Men (We Jazz Records)

 With Silvio
 2005: Amass All You Can (New Music Community)

 With Jupiter Horns
 2007: Street Poetry (WolfGang Records), with Hanoi Rocks

 With Orrenmaa Band
 2009: Make My Day (TO Records, Nordic Notes), with Billy Cobham & Tower Of Power Horns

 With Nils Landgren, Michael Wollny, Leszek Możdżer, Nguyên Lê, Lars Danielsson, Wolfgang Haffner, Cæcilie Norby, Céline Bonacina
 2012: The ACT Jubilee Concert (ACT)

 With Adam Bałdych & The Baltic Gang
 2012: Imaginary Room (ACT)

 With Flora Et Labora
 2012: Flora Et Labora (Konnex Records)

 With Iro Haarla Sextet
 2013: Kolibri (TUM Records)

 With Flame Jazz Messengers
 2016: Port Arthur (Fredriksson Music)

References

External links 
 Official MySpace Website
 Site at (ACT)
 
 

1977 births
Living people
Finnish trumpeters
Finnish jazz composers
Finnish jazz trumpeters
Finnish drummers
21st-century trumpeters
21st-century drummers
ACT Music artists
Edition Records artists